The white-tailed mole (Parascaptor leucura) is a species of mammal in the family Talpidae. It is found in Bangladesh, China, India, and Myanmar. 

It is the only species in the genus Parascaptor. Parascaptor species have a looser articulation between the malleus and the ectotympanic bone and a reduced or absent orbicular apophysis. They lack a tensor tympani muscle, possess complete bullae, and are extensions of the middle ear cavity that pneumatize the surrounding basicranial bones. These species with middle ears are suited for transmission of high frequencies.

References

Talpidae
Mammals of India
Taxonomy articles created by Polbot
Mammals described in 1850
Taxa named by Edward Blyth